The Zhiwulin Black goat breed from the northern Shaanxi Province of China is used for the production of cashmere fiber and meat.

Cross-breeding with the Liaoning Cashmere breed has been found to improve cashmere yields.

See also
Cashmere goat

References

Fiber-producing goat breeds
Meat goat breeds
Goat breeds originating in China
Goat breeds